Gaby Chiappe (born c. 1964) is a British screenwriter, known for her original works: television show The Level, and the films Their Finest and Misbehaviour. Prior to developing these, she worked extensively in commissioned British television, receiving praise and accolades for some of her stories. She has also acted, at university and in a small role in Their Finest.

Early life and education 
Chiappe was born in Gibraltar to Mary and William Chiappe. When she was three, the family moved to Brighton, England; Chiappe attended the Cardinal Newman Catholic School, where Mary was an English teacher and taught her daughter in the sixth form. Chiappe was then admitted to New Hall of the University of Cambridge, reading Archaeology. After her first year, she transferred to studying English Literature. At Cambridge, she "did as much acting as possible", and wanted to continue after graduating. She met future husband Dominic Gray at university.

Career 
Chiappe worked in fringe theatre for a decade after graduating from Cambridge. To make a living, she took up various jobs in this time, including what Gibraltar Magazine summarises as "teaching English as a foreign language, selling vintage clothes in Kensington market, reviewing plays, reading scripts and doing bits of journalism". As part of the theatre company Trouble and Strife she contributed to writing two plays. During this time, she also unsuccessfully tried to write a novel. However, she found this lifestyle unsatisfying and felt that her playwriting was not building a career. Chiappe and husband Gray then moved to Leeds in 1997. At the same time, she was offered the opportunity to write a trial script, like a writing audition, for television show Family Affairs, which a friend was working on. Chiappe got the job – while she was writing commissioned scripts for the show, she realised that "script writing was the culmination of all that interested her".

Chiappe worked on Family Affairs until 2002, in a busy work environment. After a few years as a working screenwriter, Chiappe got her first agent, Christine Glover, who had been recommended by a friend and who was still her agent in 2017. Regarding writing for television, Chiappe has said that she is a slow writer and meets the industry's strict deadlines only by working at all hours. From 2000 to 2015, Chiappe worked on various other soaps and television shows as a commissioned writer, and during this time she began developing her own series: The Level, which she co-created with Alex Perrin and which aired in 2016.

In her last commissioned television role, writing for Scottish drama Shetland, Chiappe and script executive Clare Batty wrote a difficult storyline about rape, which was received positively and described as important and powerful, and not gratuitous. Chiappe had worked with the organisation Rape Crisis at their HQ in Leeds to develop the storyline. Chiappe and Batty received praise for how they presented the subject.

Chiappe had starting working on her first feature film screenplay, Their Finest, an adaptation from the novel Their Finest Hour and a Half, in 2008 or 2009; it was filmed five or six years later. She also appears in a cameo in one of the World War II propaganda films shown in the film. In this process, Chiappe is said in Gibraltar Magazine to have "found there wasn't too big a difference between writing scripts for television and film". In 2017, Chiappe was adapting another novel, Dark Matter, for screenplay. She noted that she had more freedom to write a feature film and develop a television series as her children got older.

In 2018, the Writers' Guild of Great Britain released a report they had commissioned about gender inequality in screenwriting, simultaneously launching a campaign called Equality Writes, backed by various female writers, including Chiappe, and asking for an equal split of writers by 2020.

Expanding into more films, Chiappe co-wrote the 2020 film Misbehaviour with Rebecca Frayn, about the 1970 Miss World pageant and Women's liberation movement. In 2019, she was set to write for the Ed Rubin television development The Beast Must Die. During the COVID-19 pandemic, Chiappe was one of the writers who contributed to ITV's Isolation Stories.

Filmography 
Sources: Gibraltar Magazine; Film Stories; BIFA; WGGB

Notes

References

External links

1960s births
Living people
Alumni of the University of Cambridge
British screenwriters
British women screenwriters
People from Brighton and Hove
Gibraltarians
Writers from Leeds